Amnesia is a 1994 Chilean drama film directed by Gonzalo Justiniano. The film was selected as the Chilean entry for the Best Foreign Language Film at the 67th Academy Awards, but was not accepted as a nominee.

Plot 
After years of searching, Ramirez, a former soldier tormented by his conscience, manages to track down his former army sergeant, Zúñiga, under whose cruel orders he served as a guard at a prisoner camp in the desert after the military coup of 1973. Over some drinks, Ramírez forces Zúñiga to recall a violent past that he believed he had left behind, unaware that the seemingly cordial reunion is part of Ramírez's plan to take revenge on him for the sake of his victims.

Cast
 Julio Jung as Zúñiga
 Pedro Vicuña as Ramírez
 José Secall as Carrasco
 Marcela Osorio as Marta
 Myriam Palacios as Yolanda
 José Martin as Alvear
 Nelson Villagra as Captain Mandiola

See also
 List of submissions to the 67th Academy Awards for Best Foreign Language Film
 List of Chilean submissions for the Academy Award for Best Foreign Language Film

References

External links
 

1994 films
1994 drama films
1990s Spanish-language films
Chilean drama films
Films about the Chilean military dictatorship